Clan Bruce is a Lowlands Scottish clan. It was a royal house in the 14th century, producing two kings of Scotland (Robert the Bruce and David II of Scotland), and a disputed High King of Ireland, Edward Bruce.

Origins
The surname Bruce comes from the Flemish de Bruce, derived from the lands now called Bruges in Belgium.
For other the surname comes from the French de Brus or de Bruis, derived from the lands now called Brix, Normandy, France. There is no evidence to support a claim that a member of the family, 'Robert de Brix', served under William the Conqueror during the Norman Conquest of England. This notion is now believed to have originated in unreliable lists, derived from the later Middle Ages, of people who supposedly fought at the Battle of Hastings.

Both the English and Scots lines of the Brus/Bruce family demonstrably descend from Robert de Brus, 1st Lord of Annandale who came to England in 1106. Robert de Brus was a companion-in-arms of Prince David, later David I of Scotland. In 1124 he followed David north to reclaim his kingdom. When a civil war broke out in England between Empress Matilda and her cousin, Stephen, David I of Scotland led a force into England. However de Brus did not follow David and instead joined the English and at the Battle of the Standard in 1138 he took prisoner his own son, who was now Lord of the lands of Annandale. Robert de Brus, 1st Lord of Annandale died on 11 May 1141 and was buried at Gysburn.

Foundation of the royal line

The foundation for the Bruce royal claim came in 1219 when Robert Bruce, 4th Lord of Annandale married Isobel of Huntingdon, daughter of David of Scotland, 8th Earl of Huntingdon and niece of William the Lion. The union brought both great wealth, with the addition of lands in both England and Scotland. Their son, Robert Bruce, 5th Lord of Annandale, known as 'the competitor' was sometime Tanist (a particularly Gaelic type of heir) to the throne. On the death of Alexander III of Scotland both Bruce and John Balliol claimed succession. Margaret, Alexander's infant granddaughter was named as heir, however, she died in 1290 travelling to Scotland to claim her throne. Soon after the death of young queen Margaret, fearing civil war between the Bruce and Balliol families and their supporters, the Guardians of Scotland asked the kingdom's southern neighbour, Edward I of England to arbitrate among the claimants in order to avoid civil war. Edward I saw this as the opportunity he had long been waiting for to conquer Scotland as he had conquered Wales and rule over all the British Isles. In 1292 Edward chose Balliol who swore allegiance to the English monarch. It was not long, however, before Balliol rebelled against Edward, eventually leading to John's defeat and forced abdication after the Battle of Dunbar in 1296.

Ascent to the throne

 
With the abdication of John Balliol, Scotland was effectively without a monarch. Robert the Bruce swore allegiance to Edward at Berwick-upon-Tweed but breached this oath when he joined the Scottish revolt the following year. In the summer of 1297 he again swore allegiance to Edward in what is known as the Capitulation of Irvine. Bruce appears to have sided with the Scots during the Battle of Stirling Bridge but when Edward returned victorious to England after the Battle of Falkirk, Bruce's lands of Annandale and Carrick were exempted from the lordships and lands which Edward assigned to his followers. Bruce, it seems, was seen as a man whose allegiance might still be won.

Bruce and John Comyn (a rival for the throne) succeeded William Wallace as Guardians of Scotland, but their rivalry threatened the stability of the country. A meeting was arranged at Greyfriars Church, Dumfries which was neutral ground, but Bruce stabbed Comyn through the heart, and as a result was excommunicated by Pope Clement V. Nevertheless, Robert the Bruce was crowned King of Scotland at Scone, Perthshire in 1306. However, soon after he was forced by the English to retreat into Argyll, in an attempt to reach his Clan Campbell allies. The Clan MacDougall, whose chief was the uncle of John Comyn who Bruce had murdered, surprised the Bruce and defeated him in what was known as the Battle of Dalrigh. The king escaped but left behind what was described as a magnificent example of Celtic jewellery, known as the Brooch of Lorne and it became one of the Clan MacDougall's great treasures. Three years later Robert the Bruce led three thousand battle hardened veterans into Argyll against the MacDougalls. John MacDougall of Lorne set an ambush for them but in the ensuing Battle of the Pass of Brander the MacDougalls were defeated and forced to flee. The MacDougalls' lands were then forfeited by the king and he gave them to the Campbells for their loyalty. Robert the Bruce led the Scottish army at the Battle of Bannockburn in 1314 where the English were defeated.

In 1334 Thomas Bruce, who claimed kinship with the royal house of Bruce, organized a rising in the Kyle, along with Robert Stewart (later Robert II of Scotland) against the English.

After Robert the Bruce
Robert the Bruce's son, David II of Scotland became king on his father's death in 1329. In 1346 under the terms of the Auld Alliance David marched south into England in the interests of France, but was defeated at the Battle of Neville's Cross and imprisoned on 17 October of that year, and remained in England for eleven years. David returned to Scotland after negotiation of a treaty and ruled there until he died in Edinburgh Castle unexpectedly in 1371 without issue. The line of succession passed to the House of Stewart.

Sir Edward Bruce was made commendator of Kinloss Abbey, which included the Barony of Muirton, and was appointed a judge in 1597. He was appointed a Lord of Parliament with the title of Lord Kinloss in 1601. Edward Bruce accompanied James VI to claim his English throne in 1603. As a result, he was subsequently appointed to English judicial office as Master of the Rolls. He was granted the Barony of Kinloss as Lord Bruce of Kinloss in 1608. In 1633 his son, Thomas, was created first Earl of Elgin. When the fourth Earl died without issue, the title passed to the descendants of Sir George Bruce of Carnock, who already held the title Earl of Kincardine and in 1747 the Earldoms were united.

Thomas Bruce, 7th Earl of Elgin was a diplomat and ambassador to the Ottoman Empire between 1799 and 1803. He spent much of his fortune smuggling marble sculptures from the Athens Parthenon out of the Ottoman Empire. They are now commonly referred to as the Elgin Marbles. His son, James, was Governor General of the Province of Canada and Viceroy of India.

Clan Chief
The current Chief, Andrew Bruce, 11th Earl of Elgin, is prominent in Scottish affairs and is convener of the Standing Council of Scottish Chiefs.

Castles
Castles that have belonged to the Clan Bruce include: 
 Fyvie Castle
 Airth Castle
 Muness Castle
 Thomaston Castle
 Culross Palace
 Clackmannan Tower
 Fingask Castle
 Kinross House
 Lochleven Castle
 Lochmaben Castle
 Turnberry Castle

See also
 Scottish Clan
 Earl of Elgin
 Earl of Kincardine
 Robert the Bruce
 Edward Bruce
 David Bruce
 Lord of Annandale

References

Bibliography 
 

10th-century establishments in Scotland
 
Bruce
Scoto-Normans

Scottish Lowlands